Wang Nam Khiao is a district (amphoe) in the southern part of Nakhon Ratchasima province, northeastern Thailand.

History
The minor district (king amphoe) Wang Nam Khiao was created by separating the four tambons Wang Nam Khiao, Wang Mi, Udom Sap, and Raroeng of Pak Thong Chai district on 1 April 1992. It was upgraded to a full district on 5 December 1996.

Geography
Neighbouring districts are (from the north clockwise): Pak Thong Chai, Khon Buri of Nakhon Ratchasima Province; Na Di and Prachantakham of Prachinburi province; Pak Chong and Sung Noen of Nakhon Ratchasima.

The Sankamphaeng Range mountainous area is in the southern part of this district.

Administration
The district is divided into five subdistricts (tambons). San Chao Pho is a township (thesaban tambon), which covers parts of the tambon Wang Nam Khiao and Thai Samakkhi.

References

External links
http://www.wangnamkhiao.net Official Wangnamkhiao Tourist
http://www.wnk.go.th Website of district (Thai)
http://www.wangnamkeowdd.com Website of district (Thai)
amphoe.com

Wang Nam Khiao